

Bryophytes

Plants

Angiosperms

Archosauromorphs

General research
 Massospondylus gastroliths are documented.

Newly named dinosaurs
Data courtesy of George Olshevsky's dinosaur genera list.

Newly named birds

Newly named pterosaurs

References 

 Raath, M.A. (1974). Fossil vertebrate studies in Rhodesia: further evidence of gastroliths in Prosauropod dinosaurs. Arnoldia Rhodesia. 7 (5): 1–7.
 Sanders F, Manley K, Carpenter K. Gastroliths from the Lower Cretaceous sauropod Cedarosaurus weiskopfae. In: Tanke D.H, Carpenter K, editors. Mesozoic vertebrate life: new research inspired by the paleontology of Philip J. Currie. Indiana University Press; Bloomington, IN: 2001. pp. 166–180.

 
Paleontology